The 2019 Military World Games, officially known as the 7th CISM Military World Games, and commonly known as Wuhan 2019, was held from October 18–27, 2019 in Wuhan, Hubei, China.

The 7th Military World Games was the first international military multisport event to be held in China. The event was also the nation’s largest military sports event ever with 9,308 athletes from 109 countries competing in 329 events and 27 sporting disciplines. The multisport event included 25 official and 2 demonstrative sports. Six sport disciplines such as badminton, tennis, table tennis, women's boxing, and men's gymnastics made their debuts in the event.

The Military World Games was also the second biggest international sport event to be held in 2019. The Games were organized by the Military Sports Commission of China, Ministry of National Defense of the People's Republic of China, and the military commands (Army in accordance with CISM regulations and the rules of the International Sports Federations ). For the first time in the history of the Military World Games, an Olympic village was set up for the athletes prior to the commencement of the Games. The village was officially opened for the athletes following the flag-raising ceremony.

Host nation China sent a delegation consisting of 553 participants for the games, which marked the record number of participants to represent a nation at a single Military World Games. Around 230,000 volunteers were recruited for the event.

Bidding 
Following the conclusion of the 2015 Military World Games, China won the bid to host the Games for the first time.

Venues 
The event was held in 35 venues. The Wuhan Sports Center hosted a soccer competition for both men and women held from October 16–27.

Houhu block

Wuhan Five Rings Sports Center

Others

Zhuankou block

Wuhan Sports Center

Others

Guanggu block

Huangjiahu block

Opening ceremony 

The opening ceremony was held on 18 October 2019 and the event was officially opened by the General Secretary of the Chinese Communist Party, Chairman of the Central Military Commission (CMC), President of the People's Republic of China Xi Jinping. An extravaganza titled "Torch of Peace" was performed during the opening ceremony highlighting the main motto of the event.

Prior to the opening ceremony, a light show was set to be staged in the Yangtze River in Wuhan. It featured a screen made up of millions of small LED lights installed on bridges and buildings along the bank of the Yangtze River. The torch relay for the event was held on 16 October 2019 with the participation of 100 torchbearers. Liao Hui, 2008 Olympic gold medalist in weightlifting, began the torch rally while hammer thrower Zhang Wenxiu concluded the torch relay. Flag raising ceremony was also held on 16 October 2019.

Mascot 
The emblem and mascot along with the website were unveiled on 24 November 2017 by Ministry of National Defense of China. The mascot, named Bingbing, was designed based on the Chinese sturgeon.

Marketing 
An online store and 21 franchised retail stores were newly opened in order to promote the sales of licensed items.

Sports 
The competition involved 28 sports.

Pentathlon
 (5)
 (6)
 (5)
 (6)
Army Sports
 (8)
 (18)
 (2)
Aquatics
 (12)
 (5)
 (42)
 (18)
Main Sports
 (Athletics and Para Athletics) (45)+(29)
 (Road Cycling) (6)
 (25)
Martial Arts
 (15)
 (12)
 (16)
 (16)
 (18)
Team Sports
 (2)
 (2)
 (Indoor and Beach Volleyball) (4)
Other Sports
 (Archery and Para Archery) (5)+(3) 
 (6)
 (2)
 (4)
 (6)
 (Triathlon and Senior triathlon) (5)+(3)

Demonstration sports
 (5)
Gymnastics
 (8)

Records 
On 20 October 2019, China's Lu Pinpin broke the world record in the women's 500 m obstacle swimming course classified under the military pentathlon with a record timing of 2 minutes and 10.9 seconds.

Overall, 82 records were broken during the nine day multisport event.

Controversies

Cheating 
China's orienteering teams originally captured a gold and a silver medal in women as well as a silver in men. They were all disqualified by the International Orienteering Federation after it was found out that they had been cheating through access to secretly marked paths, and received external assistance thus gaining major unfair advantage over other competitors. A common protest was also held by the competitors from Russia, Switzerland, France, Belgium, Poland, and Austria accusing the Chinese team for gaining major unfair advantage in the competition.

COVID-19 conspiracy theories 
During the COVID-19 pandemic, conspiracy theories emerged in China that the SARS-CoV-2 virus originated in the United States and was brought to China by an American participant in the Military World Games. One version of the conspiracy theory states that the virus was created by the CIA. A Chinese government official supported and helped spread one of the conspiracy theories. Athletes Élodie Clouvel and Matteo Tagliariol each stated they developed a severe illness around the time they attended the games, but there is no evidence that they transmitted these illnesses – neither at the games nor upon returning to their units. A U.S. Army athlete who attended the games was accused of being "patient zero" of the novel coronavirus outbreak in Wuhan, and was harassed on social media, despite never having symptoms or testing positive. A coronavirus public health exercise in the United States called Event 201 was held at the same time as the games, and this is sometimes cited by conspiracy theorists as further evidence of misconduct.

Participating nations 
It was reported that 109 nations took part in the event, including athletes from Russia. In September 2019, the International Association of Athletics Federation approved athletes from Russia with the Authorized National Athlete (ANA) status to take part at the event. However, the All Russia Athletics Federation remained silent on the participation of its athletes. The State of Palestine participated in the event, but Israel did not.

List of participating nations
9,308 athletes from 110 countries participated in the games:

Calendar

Medal table

Source:

Note: Para Athletics, Para Archery, Gymnastics, Tennis and three Senior Triathlon events not counted in medal table.

Results
 https://web.archive.org/web/20191112134942/https://results.wuhan2019mwg.cn/file/RESULTS-7th%20CISM%20Military%20World%20Games-%E6%80%BB%E6%88%90%E7%BB%A9%E5%86%8C.pdf
 https://web.archive.org/web/20191028234735/https://results.wuhan2019mwg.cn/index.htm#/totalmedal
 https://web.archive.org/web/20191112134942/https://results.wuhan2019mwg.cn/file/RESULTS-7th%20CISM%20Military%20World%20Games-%E6%80%BB%E6%88%90%E7%BB%A9%E5%86%8C.pdf
 https://web.archive.org/web/20191112135029/https://results.wuhan2019mwg.cn/index.htm#/index
 https://web.archive.org/web/20191112135047/http://web.archive.org/screenshot/https://results.wuhan2019mwg.cn/index.htm
Results book (Track & Field)
Results book (Marathon) 
Swimming Results book 
Orienteering Results book 
Fencing Results book

References

External links 

 Results book

 
Military World Games
Military World Games
International sports competitions hosted by China
Military
Military World Games
Multi-sport events in China
Sport in Wuhan